The 2016 WNBA draft is the league's draft for the 2016 WNBA season. It was held on April 14 at Mohegan Sun Arena in Uncasville, Connecticut.

The draft was most notable for Connecticut producing the top three picks, with #1 pick Breanna Stewart followed by Moriah Jefferson and Morgan Tuck. This is the first time in history that the top three draft picks came from the same school.

Draft lottery
The lottery selection to determine the order of the top four picks in the 2016 draft occurred on September 24, 2015. The winner of the lottery, the Seattle Storm, picked first, marking the first pick for the Storm for the second straight year.

Lottery chances
Seattle Storm (442 out of 1,000) - Won
San Antonio Stars (276 out of 1,000)
Connecticut Sun (178 out of 1,000)
Atlanta Dream (104 out of 1,000)

This is the third time that the lottery was won by the team that had the highest odds. The lottery odds were based on combined records from the 2014 and 2015 WNBA season. Seattle Storm, the worst two-year record, was guaranteed with at least the third pick.

Key

Draft selections

Round 1

Round 2

Third round

Notable prospects
On September 24, 2015, WNBA.com posted notable prospects for the draft. The list included: 
Moriah Jefferson - UConn
Tiffany Mitchell - South Carolina
Breanna Stewart - UConn
Jillian Alleyne - Oregon
Jonquel Jones - George Washington
Morgan Tuck - UConn
Courtney Williams - South Florida
The WNBA also selected twelve players to be in attendance at the draft. Those twelve were:
 Rachel Banham, Minnesota
 Imani Boyette, Texas
 Kahleah Copper, Rutgers
 Moriah Jefferson, Connecticut
 Jonquel Jones, George Washington
 Tiffany Mitchell, South Carolina
 Aerial Powers, Michigan State
 Breanna Stewart, Connecticut
 Morgan Tuck, Connecticut
 Courtney Walker, Texas A&M
 Talia Walton, Washington
 Courtney Williams, South Florida
Of those 12 players, 10 were picked in the 1st round. Only Courtney Walker and Talia Walton were picked later.

Footnotes

References

Women's National Basketball Association Draft
Draft